Xiamen railway station is a railway station located in Xiamen, Fujian, China, on the Yingxia Railway which operated by Nanchang Railway Bureau, China Railway Corporation.

Located in the south-western part of Xiamen Island, near downtown Xiamen, Xiamen railway station is a dead-end (terminal) station.

Service

Xiamen railway station is an exception from the typical arrangement of rail services in Fujian's cities, in that it combines both "traditional" passenger trains and high-speed (D-series) trains at a single downtown location.

Since 2010, this has been the southern terminal of the Fuzhou–Xiamen railway (Fuxia), with frequent D-series trains departing to Fuzhou (via Quanzhou and other coastal cities), some of them continuing north to Wenzhou, Ningbo, Hangzhou and Shanghai Hongqiao. On June 29, 2012, the new Longyan–Xiamen railway (Longxia) opened as well, with frequent D-series trains connecting Xiamen with Longyan (with stops in Zhangzhou and Nanjing County).

Numerous conventional (K-series) trains connect Xiamen with major cities throughout China's interior. They have traditionally left the city via the Yingtan–Xiamen railway, although some (those with destinations in southern China) may have been now switched to the faster Longxia line.

History
The station opened on April 17, 1957.
In 2012, the upgrade construction for the station began, the project will increase the numbers of tracks from 5 to 9, platforms from 3 to 5, with the rebuild of the main building of the station, in order to relieve crowding.

Nearby stations
 Xiamen Gaoqi railway station (formerly known Xiamen North) - near the north-western corner of Xiamen Island; it serves as a terminal for a few conventional trains

Local transportation
Xiamen BRT has a stop outside of the railway station.

Line 3 of Xiamen Metro will come to Xiamen railway station in 2021.

References

External links

Xiamen Railway Station Official website 
Xiamen train schedule 

Railway stations in Fujian
Railway stations in China opened in 1957
Buildings and structures in Xiamen